The Mongolia Davis Cup team represents Mongolia in Davis Cup tennis competition and are governed by the Mongolian Tennis Association.

Mongolia currently compete in the Asia/Oceania Zone of Group IV.

Mongolia finished fifth of six teams in their Group IV round-robin pool in 2008.

History
Mongolia competed in its first Davis Cup in 2008.

Current team (2022) 

TBD

See also
Davis Cup

External links

Davis Cup teams
Davis Cup
Davis Cup